Lake Tohmajärvi is a medium-sized shallow lake in the Tohmajoki main catchment area. It is located in the North Karelia region, in the very east of Finland, just outside the town of Tohmajärvi next to the border with Russia.

See also
List of lakes in Finland

References

Lakes of Tohmajärvi